The Inner Mongolia People's Publishing House (IMPPH) is a publishing company based in Hohhot, the capital of the Inner Mongolia autonomous region of the People's Republic of China. It was established in 1951. Their president is Wang Dongsheng.

Publications
IMPPH publish original works in Chinese and Mongolian, as well as translations of English works.

Incidents
IMPPH have been accused of violations of intellectual property rights on various occasions. In 2001, there appeared a book with the imprint of IMPPH, whose author's pseudonym, title, cover art, and content bore a close resemblance to Han Han's Triple Doors; however, a spokesperson for IMPPH denied that the company had actually printed those books, instead claiming that another party was misusing their name. A 2004 article by the China Youth Daily also claimed that the IMPPH's 2001 book about chengyu plagiarised roughly 500,000 words from a similar book published four years earlier by the China Youth Press.

In 2004, the IMPPH were also fined by the General Administration of Press and Publication for trading in book registration numbers. They sold the book registration numbers to a publishing company in Jiangxi, enabling the latter to carry out illegal publication activities.

See also
 Inner Mongolia University Press
 Inner Mongolia Education Press

Notes

External links
 Official website

Publishing companies established in 1951
Companies based in Hohhot
Book publishing companies of China
Mass media in Hohhot
Chinese companies established in 1951